The Minnesota Senate, District 9, includes communities in Cass, Morrison, Todd and Wadena counties in the north central part of the state. It is currently represented by Republican Senate Majority Leader Paul Gazelka.

List of senators 

Minnesota Senate districts
Morrison County, Minnesota
Todd County, Minnesota
Wadena County, Minnesota